Hannah Darling (born May 30, 1996) is a Canadian rugby union player and considered the national seven's team weapon at restarts.

Darling was introduced to rugby union at the age of 14 and made her sevens national debut at the 2014 Hong Kong Invitational Sevens. She won a gold medal at the 2015 Pan American Games as a member of the Canadian women's rugby sevens team. In 2016, Darling was named to Canada's first ever women's rugby sevens Olympic team. In October 2018, she retired from the national sevens team.

References

External links
 
 
 
 

1996 births
Living people
Canadian female rugby union players
Rugby sevens players at the 2015 Pan American Games
Pan American Games gold medalists for Canada
Rugby sevens players at the 2016 Summer Olympics
Olympic rugby sevens players of Canada
Canada international rugby sevens players
Female rugby sevens players
Sportspeople from Peterborough, Ontario
Rugby sevens players at the 2014 Summer Youth Olympics
Olympic bronze medalists for Canada
Olympic medalists in rugby sevens
Medalists at the 2016 Summer Olympics
Pan American Games medalists in rugby sevens
Medalists at the 2015 Pan American Games
Youth Olympic silver medalists for Canada
Canada international women's rugby sevens players